The fifth season of Medium, an American television series, consisted of 19 episodes, premiering on February 2, 2009, and ending on June 1, 2009. This was the final season of the show to air on NBC. Although the show was initially renewed for a sixth season, NBC reversed course and cancelled it. CBS, whose studio produced the show, picked it up within 24 hours after NBC's cancellation.

Production
With the ratings improvement Medium demonstrated in its fourth season after returning to Mondays, it was one of the first series to be renewed in an early announcement in April 2008 from NBC regarding its 2008–09 season. Similar to the previous season, Medium was initially scheduled to move to the Sunday night line-up; however, a December 2008 press release revealed that the fifth season would air in the series' original Monday night 10 p.m. time slot.

After some ratings erosion during its fifth season, NBC renewed Medium for an abridged sixth season in early May 2009. However, within a week negotiations stalled over episode count and subsequently NBC decided not to renew the series despite the fact that it outperformed some of the network's renewed shows. Within 24 hours of NBC's cancellation, CBS, whose production arm produces the series, renewed the show for a full 22-episode season.

Plot
Season 5 gets off to a better start for the DuBois family.  Allison gets her job back working for the DA, while Joe gets hired by a greedy entrepreneur who wants and expects Allison to dream up winning stock prices.  Allison finds herself being stalked by a deranged fanatic and gets the job opportunity of a lifetime, but it's for the boss whose son is a serial killer so they can keep her quiet since she works for the DA.  Meanwhile, Cynthia Keener makes one more appearance in this season trying to help a girl that was raped and kidnapped years earlier only to do exactly the same thing to the guy who kidnapped her turns the tables on him and gets his wife, but Ms. Keener while still in prison for killing her daughter's killer helps Allison save the young woman. Enzo Rossi, the real life son of Patricia Arquette, plays a character in the episode A Person of Interest.  Unfortunately, the season ends on a bad turn, Allison discovers she has a brain tumor located in her brain stem, but puts off her surgery to catch two bad guys, one working for Devalos and the other in a drug cartel.

Cast and characters

Main cast 
 Patricia Arquette as Allison DuBois
 Miguel Sandoval as Manuel Devalos
 David Cubitt as Lee Scanlon
 Sofia Vassilieva as Ariel DuBois
 Maria Lark as Bridgette DuBois
 Jake Weber as Joe DuBois

Recurring cast 
 Madison and Miranda Carabello as Marie DuBois
 Bruce Gray as Joe's Dad
 Tina DiJoseph as Lynn DiNovi
 Amanda Detmer Joe's Sister
 Anjelica Huston as Cynthia Keener

Episodes

References

External links 
 
 

Medium (TV series) seasons
2009 American television seasons